Jessica Lurie is an American composer, performance artist and woodwind player, originally hailing from Seattle and now living in Brooklyn, New York.

Lurie first gained notice as a member of The Billy Tipton Memorial Saxophone Quartet, an all-female horn ensemble who released its first album in 1993.  In 1995, she also had a first release with the group Living Daylights, which performs jazz-jamband music. She has also performed as the leader of the Jessica Lurie Ensemble since 2002.

She composed music for No Sleep Won't Kill You (2010) by Croatian filmmaker Marko Mestrovic, co-scored with composer Abraham Gomez-Delgado, and Fibonacci Bread (2012), a short animation by Croatian artist Danijel Zezelj.

Discography

Solo albums 

 La Luce Azzurra (with Metropolizani) (1998)
 Motorbison Serenade (2000, Zipa Music)
 School of One (with Will Dowd) (2002)
 Tiger, Tiger (2005)
 This is what its like to be (with Andrew Drury Duo) (2005, Zipa Music)
 Licorice and Smoke (2006, Zipa Music )
 Long Haul (2017, Zipa Music)

With Jessica Lurie Ensemble 

 !Zipa Buka! (2003, Zipa Music)
 Shop of Wild Dreams (2009, Zipa Music)
 Megaphone Heart (2012, Zipa Music)
 Carambolage (2021)

With The Tiptons Sax Quartet 

Saxhouse (1993, Knitting Factory, rereleased by Horn Hut in 1994)
Make It Funky God (1994, Horn Hut)
Box (1996, New World Records)
Pollo d'Oro (with Ne Zhdali) (1997, No Man's Land)
Sunshine Bundtcake (2000, New World Records)
Short Cuts (2003, Spoot & Zipa)
Tsunami (2004, No Man's Land/Spoot & Zipa)
Surrounded by Horns (2004, Stockfisch)
Drive (2005, Spoot & Zipa)
Laws Of Motion (2008, Spoot & Zipa)
Strange Flower (2010, Spoot & Zipa)
Tiny Lower Case (2014, Spoot & Zipa)
Wabi Sabi (2021, Sowiesound)

With Living Daylights 

 Falling Down Laughing (1995, Liquid City)
 500 Pound Cat (1998, Liquid City)
 Electric Rosary (2000, Liquid City)
 Night of the Living Daylights (2003)

With Eyvind Kang 
7 NADEs (Tzadik, 1996)
Theater of Mineral NADEs (Tzadik, 1998)
The Story of Iceland (Tzadik, 2000)

With Jon Madof's Zion80 
Zion80 (Tzadik, 2013)
Adramelech: Book of Angels Volume 22 (Tzadik, 2014)

With La Buya 

 La Buya (2021)

With Breslov Bar Band 

 Holy Chutzpah (2022)

Other appearances 

 The Posies, Amazing Disgrace (1996, DGC) (tenor saxophone on "Please Return It")
 Circus Amok Band, Citizen*ship (2014) (saxophone, flute, vocals)
 Darshan, Raza (2017, Chant) (alto and baritone saxophone)

References

External links
 Official site
 Jessica Lurie Ensemble collection at the Internet Archive's live music archive

Living people
Year of birth missing (living people)
American women composers
21st-century American composers
21st-century American women musicians
The Tiptons Sax Quartet members
21st-century women composers